Rising Star Award may refer to:

ACB Rising Star Award, pro basketball league in Spain
ACS Rising Star Award, awarded by the Women Chemists Committee.
AFL Rising Star, Australian Football League 
EuroLeague Rising Star, European pro basketball league
European Athletics Rising Star Award, European track and field, cross country running
World Athletics Rising Star Award, world athletics
Galaxie Rising Star Award, Canadian music award, Stingray Music
Rising Star Award, BAFTA, acting award, British Academy of Film and Television Arts 
Rising Star (Brit Award), upcoming musician award, British Phonographic Industry